Lizzie McGuire: Total Party! is a soundtrack album which contains songs aimed at girls, released as a tie-in to the Lizzie McGuire TV series. Almost all of the songs are party songs. It includes songs from Pink, Vitamin C, A*Teens, Jesse McCartney and Atomic Kitten.

Track listing 

 "Theme to Lizzie McGuire" (Extended Supa Mix) – Angie Jaree 
 "Perfect Day" (Sunshine Mix) - Hoku 
 "Crush'n" - Jesse McCartney 
 "Get the Party Started" (Radio Disney Mix) - P!nk 
 "Dancing Queen" - A*Teens 
 "No More (Baby I'ma Do Right)" - 3LW 
  "Ladies Night" - Atomic Kitten 
 "1-2-3" - Nikki Cleary 
 "That's What Girls Do" - No Secrets 
 "Hey Now (Girls Just Wanna Have Fun)" - Triple Image featuring Jamie Lynn Spears 
 "Smile" - Vitamin C 
 "Absolutely (Story of a Girl)" - Nine Days  
 "Us Against The World" - Play
 "C'est la Vie" - B*Witched

Bonus Karaoke Instrumentals
15. "I Can't Wait"
16. "Hey Now (Girls Just Wanna Have Fun)"
17. "Get the Party Started" (Radio Disney Mix)

Charts

References

External links
Walt Disney Records | Lizzie McGuire Total Party
Lizzie McGuire Total Party! (Internet Archive)

Television soundtracks
Lizzie McGuire
2004 soundtrack albums
Walt Disney Records soundtracks